The Deutsche Tourenwagen Cup (DTC, formerly known as ADAC Procar Series) was a yearly motorsport series in Germany and some surrounding countries. The series has been running since 1995 and was folded in 2017.

Current status
Currently the DTC is the highest level of German motorsport that runs cars to the Super 2000 regulations used in World Touring Car Championship (WTCC). To fill up the grid, and to promote new, young drivers the few Super 2000 cars are joined by the less advanced Division 2 and 3 series (the Super 2000 cars being called Division 1), bringing up the total number of starting drivers to around 20 to 25. Division 1 also allows cars of BTCC-spec – the 2005 champion Mathias Schläppi won in a BTCC-built MG ZS.

As of 2016 there are 3 different classes in the DTC
 Superproduction - 1.6 L, turbocharged cars up to 300 Bhp
 Production 1 - 1.6 L, turbocharged cars up to 230 Bhp
 Production 2 - 2.0 L, turbocharged cars up to 260 Bhp

History
The DTC have existed since 1995 as a championship for Super Production cars under the name DTC (Deutsche Tourenwagen Challenge). Ford and Hotfiel Sport had an important presence in the early and middle parts of the history of the series with Thomas Klenke winning the championship in 2002. The series was called the DMSB Produktionswagen Meisterschaft in 2004 and raced in two rounds of the European Touring Car Championship.

The 2005 season saw the introduction of Super 2000 rules for Division 1 and the series changed its name to the DMSB Produktionswagen Meisterschaft. Mathias Schläppi in a MG ZS for Maurer Motorsport was the undisputed champion, winning 12 out of 16 races. 2006 saw Maurer Motorsport swapping their MG's for Chevrolet's and Mathias Schläppi for ex-BTCC driver Vincent Radermecker. Schläppi instead drove for the new TFS-Yaco team running Toyota Corollas. Vincent Radermecker would win Maurer's second title while Schläppi was second in the championship.

While arguably having some talented drivers and teams such as Radermecker, Schläppi, Maurer Motorsport and so on the DTC is very minor compared to the immensely popular DTM series.

Scoring system
 Below is the scoring system used for the results of each race during the 2010 season:

Champions

See also
V8Star Series
Formula König
ADAC Formel Masters
Volkswagen Scirocco R-Cup

References

External links

 

 
Touring car racing series
Auto racing series in Germany
Recurring sporting events established in 1995